The Islamic Games was a multi-sport event for athletes from Muslim countries that was held from 26 September to 6 October 1980 in İzmir, Turkey. Although 42 nations were invited to compete at the competition, ultimately only ten nations took part, with around 700 athletes present. Among the nations competing at the tournament, only Algeria and Libya had sent delegations to the 1980 Summer Olympics in Moscow (the rest observed the boycott).

History
The idea for the games was initiated in 1979, following an agreement between foreign ministers at a regional meeting in Islamabad. Izmir was chosen as the host and was well equipped for the task given pre-existing facilities stemming from its hosting of the 1971 Mediterranean Games, with İzmir Atatürk Stadium as the main venue. Anwar Chowdhry, a Pakistani sports official, praised the coming together of Muslim-majority nations, stating that "all the countries competing have relatively the same level of performance [which] provides our athletes with encouragement to put on an even better performance".

Libya won the five-team association football tournament, going undefeated.

The games was proposed to be held on a quadrennial basis, being scheduled one year before the Summer Olympics to allow Muslim nations to prepare for the larger competition. Saudi Arabia was chosen to host the second Islamic Games in 1983, but ultimately the event was not held. A Women's Islamic Games was started in 1993 and then the Islamic Solidarity Games was inaugurated in 2005 in Saudi Arabia, continuing the legacy of an international games between Muslim-majority countries.

Editions

1980 Islamic Games

Sports

Participating nations

Medal table

See also
Islamic Solidarity Games
Women's Islamic Games

References

 
Islamic Games
Islamic Games
Sports competitions in Izmir
Multi-sport events in Turkey
Defunct multi-sport events
International sports competitions hosted by Turkey
September 1980 sports events in Asia
October 1980 sports events in Asia
20th century in İzmir